Halenkov is a municipality and village in Vsetín District in the Zlín Region of the Czech Republic. It has about 2,400 inhabitants.

History
Halenkov was founded in 1654 by Jiří Illésházy, a Hungarian nobleman who bought the Vsetín estate in 1652.

References

Villages in Vsetín District
Populated places established in 1654